Joachim Christian Andersen (born 31 May 1996) is a Danish professional footballer who plays as a centre-back for Premier League club Crystal Palace and the Denmark national team.

Club career

Youth
Andersen started playing football at the age of four for local club Greve Fodbold, where he played from 2000 until 2009. He then joined Copenhagen’s academy, School of Excellence, before leaving for Midtjylland when he was 15.
At Midtjylland he moved into the talent academy in Ikast where players like Simon Kjær, Winston Reid, Erik Sviatchenko, Viktor Fischer and Pione Sisto had stayed before him.

In April 2013, before he had made his first team debut with Midtjylland, Twente sent out scouts to observe Andersen, and offered him a one-week trial, which he accepted. Four months later, he signed a youth contract with FC Twente for a fee rumored to be around 5 million Danish kroner (€650,000). The plan was to start in the youth team in order to acclimatise, and progress to the senior sides after about 6 months.

Twente
Though he was still an under-19 player he was promoted to the senior team and on 8 November 2013, Andersen made his first appearance for Jong Twente playing the whole match. He did not play any matches for the first team in his first season, but already in his second year at the club he was promoted to train with the first team squad with players like Dušan Tadić, Hakim Ziyech, Jesús Manuel Corona, Quincy Promes, Andreas Bjelland, Kasper Kusk and Kamohelo Mokotjo.

On 7 March 2015, he got his chance in the first team debuting against Willem II, and playing the last 20 minutes. A week later, he signed a new contract with Twente until 2018. In 2015, Andersen won the prize for U19 talent of the year by the Danish Football Association.

On 22 March, he was named in the starting eleven against Groningen and scored his first goal for the first team. He slowly got more and more time on the pitch for the first team. He continued his development and became almost a regular part of the first team squad in the 2015–16 season.

Sampdoria
On 26 August 2017, Andersen signed a contract with Serie A club Sampdoria. He had offers from other clubs in different leagues but chose Sampdoria to develop in Serie A.

Andersen made his debut on 25 February 2018, in a match against Udinese. He played seven more matches that season and from the beginning of the 2018–19 season he became a regular starter attracting attention from bigger clubs. In his second season he only missed one game due to a ban. Sampdoria offered him a new contract until summer 2022 which he signed on 8 November 2018.

Lyon
On 12 July 2019, Andersen signed a five-year contract with French side Olympique Lyonnais. The transfer fee amounted to €30 million (24 + 6 million in bonuses), meaning Andersen became Lyon’s record transfer. It was also a record high transfer fee for a Danish football player.

On 2 October, he made his debut in the Champions League against RB Leipzig, and on 11 November he scored his first Champions League goal in the 3–1 win against Benfica.

Loan to Fulham
On 5 October 2020, Andersen joined Premier League club Fulham on a season-long loan. On 19 December 2020, Andersen was sent off in a 1–1 draw with Newcastle United, receiving a second yellow when he gave away a controversial penalty for a foul on Callum Wilson which was dispatched by the latter. Andersen was nominated for the league's Player of the Month award for February 2021 after a number of impressive defensive displays that saw Fulham concede just three goals in six matches as they picked up a vital nine points in their fight against relegation. On 19 March 2021, Andersen scored his first Fulham goal in a 1–2 home league defeat to Leeds United.

Crystal Palace 
On 28 July 2021, Crystal Palace announced the signing of Andersen on a five-year deal for a fee of €17.5 million with €2.5 million add-on bonuses and a 12.5% sell on fee.

International career
He represented Denmark at U16, U17, U19, U20, and U21 levels before he was called up to the senior team for matches against Kosovo and Switzerland in March 2019. On 15 October 2019, he earned his first national team cap when Denmark beat Luxembourg 4–0.

On 25 May 2021, Andersen was included in the squad for UEFA Euro 2020.

On 7 November 2022, he was included in the squad for the FIFA World Cup 2022.

Style of play 
Andersen is considered a great ball playing defender with the ability to play in both right and left side of the central defense and even in defensive midfield. In the 2018–19 season, Inter Milan midfielder Marcelo Brozović was the only player in Serie A with more accurate long passes than Andersen.

Career statistics

Club

International

Honours 
Lyon

 Coupe de la Ligue runner-up: 2019–20

References

External links

Profile at the Crystal Palace F.C. website

1996 births
Living people
People from Solrød Municipality
Sportspeople from Region Zealand
Danish men's footballers
Association football defenders
Jong FC Twente players
FC Twente players
U.C. Sampdoria players
Olympique Lyonnais players
Fulham F.C. players
Crystal Palace F.C. players
Eredivisie players
Serie A players
Ligue 1 players
Premier League players
Denmark youth international footballers
Denmark under-21 international footballers
Denmark international footballers
UEFA Euro 2020 players
2022 FIFA World Cup players
Danish expatriate men's footballers
Expatriate footballers in England
Expatriate footballers in France
Expatriate footballers in Italy
Expatriate footballers in the Netherlands
Danish expatriate sportspeople in England
Danish expatriate sportspeople in France
Danish expatriate sportspeople in Italy
Danish expatriate sportspeople in the Netherlands